Hobart City Centre (referred to as Hobart CBD) is a suburb surrounded by metropolitan Hobart, which comprises the original settlement, the central business district, and other built-up areas. It is the oldest part of Hobart and includes many of the city's important institutions and landmarks, such as Parliament, the Supreme Court, Franklin Square, the Elizabeth Street Mall, the Royal Hobart Hospital, the Theatre Royal, Odeon Theatre, State Library, the NAB Building, the Museum, and the Cenotaph. The city centre is located in the local government areas of the City of Hobart.

Although the city centre is one of the oldest and most developed areas of Hobart, demographically it is one of the less densely populated areas in the greater area of Hobart, due to its core being commercial. In an attempt to create a more vibrant city at night, the state government has been encouraging inner city residential development in recent years. The population of the city centre was 3,390 in 2021.

History

Settlement of Greater Hobart spawned from the settlement of Sullivans Cove on 21 February 1804, by order of David Collins who was most unimpressed with the initial landing site at Risdon Cove.

On 11 March 2020, the Hobart City Council opened a survey and released a baseline report on the 'Central Hobart Precincts Plan', which had a purpose "to guide future growth in a way that will strengthen what’s great about Hobart". The survey ended in April 2021. The study area covered 1364 lots of land in 64 blocks. The website outlines four general goals to:

establish a shared vision and framework for the future growth of Central Hobart and identify a set of actions to deliver it;
identify a suite of precincts across the study area and outline a vision for each of them ensuring the ongoing viability of Central Hobart as Tasmania's key administrative and commercial activity centre;
identify opportunities for increased residential densities and infrastructure as well as commercial and community services to support it;
identify the preferred urban form and scale of development for precincts based on a range of urban design, heritage, economic and social considerations.

The City wishes to increase medium-density development (dubbed 'the missing middle' in Australia and North America) "to increase the supply of housing and reduce pressure for urban sprawl". Hobart covers a significantly higher surface area for its population than many other places in the world, particularly Europe, where Hobart might cover 50 or 100 square kilometres, but actually covers more than 1,600 square kilometres. The City wants to increase diversity of transportation infrastructure, friendliness to people, sustainability, and increase density of development and natural wellbeing infrastructure (such as street trees).

Geography
The Hobart city centre draws a sense of its identity from its location between the Derwent River and the foothills of Mount Wellington. The city is concentrated with Low-rise office buildings, interspersed by parks such as Franklin Square and St Davids Park and historic precincts such as Sullivans Cove and Salamanca Place. Due to street width, the majority of Hobart CBD's streets are One-way with a few exceptions including Elizabeth Street, the main north–south thoroughfare of the city centre. Davey Street/Macquarie travel parallel as a one-way couplet carrying traffic between Hobart's major highways along the CBD's southern fringe. The streets run on a slightly warped grid pattern in the CBD, due to early planning by Lachlan Macquarie.

Governance
Administratively, the Hobart City Centre falls under the authority of the local government area of the City of Hobart. The Tasmanian Government also has authority over some aspects of the CBD, in particular the major state controlled roads passing through and around the city.

Commercial area
With the exception of Wrest Point Casino in Sandy Bay, the Hobart CBD contains all of Tasmania’s tallest buildings, including 39 Murray Street, 188 Collins Street and the Trafalgar Building. The City centre has several shopping areas including the Wellington Centre, Centrepoint and the historically significant Cat & Fiddle Arcade. Stores in this area include Myer, Target, Woolworths, H&M, JB-Hi-Fi, Kathmandu and Country Road. In September 2007, a spectacular inner city fire was responsible for the loss of one of Hobart's Myer buildings and as a result saw the construction of the  Icon Complex, boasting a 5 level Myer with specialty shops as well as a Hotel with roof top bar.

Culture
There is a large concentration of cultural institutions within the CBD including: the Tasmanian Museum and Art Gallery, the State Library of Tasmania, the Odeon Theatre, the Playhouse Theatre, and the Theatre Royal.

Every December, the city hosts the conclusion of the Sydney to Hobart Yacht Race while concurrently holding the Taste Festival. 
Every January the city hosts the Australian Wooden Boat Festival and the annual Royal Hobart Regatta is held during February.

Additional, the Salamanca Market is held at Salamanca Place every Saturday.

See also

City of Hobart
List of tallest buildings in Hobart
List of theatres in Hobart

References

Central business districts in Australia
Geography of Hobart
Economy of Hobart
Localities of City of Hobart